Together Again: For the First Time is a 1978 studio album by Mel Tormé and Buddy Rich. Originally recorded and released as a direct-to-disc LP album, it was re-issued in 1999 as When I Found You by Hindsight Records with two additional Buddy Rich Big Band instrumental tracks from the same era.

Though they had been friends for a long time, Tormé and Rich had not recorded together until this album.

Direct-to-disc recording session
In the book Traveling Music, Neil Peart (best known as the drummer for Rush) stated that each side of the album was recorded in a single take directly to the master LP, which was a throwback to recording techniques of an earlier era. Not only did the mixing need to be correct, but if a musician would make a mistake, they had to re-record from the first song. Occasionally, the musicians would hear the command "take it from the top" and start the song they had been playing, instead of starting from the first song. This restart occasionally caused some confusion among the musicians who normally respond to that command by restarting the song instead of the album.

Track listing

Original LP
Side A
 "When I Found You" (Michael Randall) – 3:18
 "Here's That Rainy Day" (Johnny Burke, Jimmy Van Heusen) – 4:56
 "Blues in the Night" (Harold Arlen, Johnny Mercer) – 8:05
Side B
 "Bluesette" (Norman Gimbel, Toots Thielemans) – 3:30
 "You Are the Sunshine of My Life" (Stevie Wonder) – 4:30
 "I Won't Last a Day Without You" (Roger Nichols, Paul Williams) – 3:56
 "Oh, Lady be Good!" (George Gershwin, Ira Gershwin) – 4:37

CD re-issue, When I Found You
"When I Found You" (Randall) –  3:14
"Here's That Rainy Day" (Burke, Van Heusen) –  4:55
"Cape Verdean Blues" (Horace Silver) – 6:12 (instrumental bonus track)
"Blues in the Night" (Arlen, Mercer) – 8:02
"Bluesette" (Gimbel, Thielemans) –  3:42
"You Are the Sunshine of My Life" (Wonder) –  4:41
"Funk City Ola" (Barry Mintzer) – 4:27 (instrumental bonus track)
"I Won't Last a Day Without You" (Nichols, Williams) – 4:28
"Oh, Lady Be Good" (Gershwin, Gershwin) – 4:12

Personnel
 Mel Tormé – vocals, arranger
 Buddy Rich – drums
 The Buddy Rich Big Band:
Hank Jones – piano
Tom Warrington – double bass
Chuck Schmidt – trumpet
Dean Pratt
John Marshall
Dave Kennedy
John Mosca – trombone
Dale Kirkland
Dave Boyle
Tony Price – tuba
Chuck Wilson – saxophone
Alan Vu Gauvin
Steve Marcus - tenor saxophone
Gary Pribeck
Greg Smith

References

Century Records CRDD 1100 (direct-to-disc LP recording)
Gryphon Records G 784 (LP)
RCA PL 25178 (LP)
Mobile Fidelity UDCD 592 (CD)
Hindsight 272 (CD reissue When I Found You)

1978 albums
Buddy Rich albums
Mel Tormé albums